Jozef Majoroš (pronounced Mayorosh) (born 19 March 1970 in Geča near Košice) is a former Slovak footballer and head coach of Liptovský Mikuláš.

Club career

Majoroš started with football in your native village Geča. Functionaries of ZŤS Košice noticed his football talent and moved Jozef to their club when he was thirteen. He played in all youth squads ZŤS Košice. In 1988 Jozef progressed to the senior team. After he finished stage in Košice he continued in your career in Dukla Banská Bystrica and then in Czech teams Viktoria Žižkov and Petra Drnovice. Jozef was declared for the Slovak Footballer of the Year in 1998 and also he was nominated to the best 11 players of the Czech Football League. He ended his career in 2004 after stage in second division team Družstevník Báč. He's coaching youth today.

International career

Majoroš played for Czechoslovakia in the 1989 FIFA World Youth Championship. He was capped 23 times for Slovakia and scored 5 goals. The most memorable goal he scored against Czech Republic at the UEFA Euro 1996 qualifying on 11 October 1995 in Bratislava. It was the winning moment in this match and Slovakia won 2-1.

Honours

Player
Slovan Bratislava
Slovak Super Liga (1): 1997-99

Petra Drnovice
Czech Cup Runners-Up (1): 1998

Individual
Slovak Footballer of the Year (1): 1998
Slovak Top eleven (1): 1998
Czech Top eleven (1): 1997

References

External links
 
 

Living people
1970 births
Association football forwards
Slovak footballers
Slovakia international footballers
FC VSS Košice players
Czech First League players
FK Viktoria Žižkov players
FK Drnovice players
ŠK Slovan Bratislava players
Aris Thessaloniki F.C. players
FC Petržalka players
Debreceni VSC players
Slovak Super Liga players
Expatriate footballers in the Czech Republic
Expatriate footballers in Hungary
FK Iskra Borčice managers
Slovak football managers
People from Košice-okolie District
Sportspeople from the Košice Region
FC Nitra players
FK Dukla Banská Bystrica players
Czechoslovakia youth international footballers